The Unity Party of Nigeria (UPN) was a Nigerian political party that was dominant in western Nigeria during the second republic (1978-1983). The party revolved around the political leadership of Obafemi Awolowo, a sometimes polemical politician but effective administrator. However, the party's main difference with its competitors was not the leader but the ideals of a social democracy it was founded on. The UPN inherited its ideology from the old Action Group and saw itself as a party for everyone. It was the only party to promote free education and called itself a welfarist party.

The desired goal of the military government of Olusegun Obasanjo to build national political parties led to a gradual weakening of ethnic politics in the second republic. The UPN, as well as the People's Redemption Party (PRP), presented the most coherent plan of action during the electioneering campaign of 1979. The party jettisoned building a coalition of comfort in a polarized political environment, but based partnerships on the cooperation of like minded advocates of democratic socialism.

The Action Congress of Nigeria was regarded as a natural successor to the Action Group and UPN.

Views
The party supported a 30-40% revenue allocation for the Federal Government, 40-50% for the states and 10% for the local governments in debates centering on the intractable revenue allocation mechanism in Nigeria. 
Free education for all
Free medical treatment
Full employment
Integrated rural development
A progressive program for development of roads and schools, and
Constitutional amendments for state creation, which implied longer time needed from initiation to approval.

References
Larry Diamond, Cleavage, Conflict, and Anxiety in the Second Nigerian Republic, The Journal of Modern African Studies > Vol. 20, No. 4 Dec. 1982
C. S. Whitaker Jr, Second Beginnings: The New Political Framework, Issue: A Journal of Opinion > Vol. 11, No. 1/2 (Spring, 1981)
Rotimi T. Suberu, The Struggle for New States in Nigeria, 1976-1990, African Affairs > Vol. 90, No. 361 (Oct., 1991), pp. 499–522

Defunct political parties in Nigeria
Ibadan
Social democratic parties in Nigeria